This is a list of diplomatic missions of Canada. Canada has an extensive diplomatic network maintained by Global Affairs Canada.

Overview
As a Commonwealth country, Canada's diplomatic missions in the capitals of other Commonwealth countries are referred to as High Commissions (as opposed to embassies). Canada has diplomatic and consular offices (including honorary consuls that are not included in this list) in over 270 locations in approximately 180 foreign countries.

Under the terms of the Canada–Australia Consular Services Sharing Agreement, the two countries provide consular services to each other's citizens at a number of locations around the world. At this time, there are 19 locations where Canadian offices provide consular services to Australians, and 12 other cities where Canadians can obtain consular services from Australian offices. In an emergency, Canadians can also seek assistance from British offices around the world if there is no resident Canadian office.

The province of Quebec has its own Ministry of International Relations (French: Ministère des Relations internationales) and a network of 33 offices in 18 countries  "to promote and defend Québec's interests internationally while ensuring respect for its authority and the consistency of government activities." Other provinces, such as Alberta, British Columbia, and Ontario, also maintain offices abroad.

From 2 June 2019, Canada suspended embassy operations in Caracas, Venezuela effective immediately because its diplomats were no longer be able to obtain visas. Minister Chrystia Freeland said in a statement that "President Nicolás Maduro’s regime has taken steps to limit the ability of foreign embassies to function in Venezuela” and "that Canadian diplomats in Venezuela will no longer be in a position to obtain diplomatic accreditation under the Maduro regime." The Canadian Embassy in Bogotá, Colombia now handles consular assistance for Canadian citizens living in Venezuela.

Africa

 Algiers (Embassy)

 Ouagadougou (Embassy)

 Yaoundé (High Commission)

 Kinshasa (Embassy)

 Cairo (Embassy)

 Addis Ababa (Embassy)

 Accra (High Commission)

 Abidjan (Embassy)

 Nairobi (High Commission)

 Bamako (Embassy)

 Rabat (Embassy)

 Maputo (High Commission)

 Abuja (High Commission)
 Lagos (Deputy High Commission)

 Kigali (Office of the High Commission)

 Dakar (Embassy)

 Pretoria (High Commission)
 Johannesburg (Trade Office)

 Juba (Embassy)

 Khartoum (Embassy)

 Dar es Salaam (High Commission)

 Tunis (Embassy)

 Lusaka (Office of the High Commission)

 Harare (Embassy)

Americas

 Buenos Aires (Embassy)

 Bridgetown (High Commission)

 La Paz (Program Office of the Embassy)

 Brasilia (Embassy)
 Rio de Janeiro (Consulate General)
 São Paulo (Consulate General)
 Belo Horizonte (Trade Office)
 Porto Alegre (Trade Office)
 Recife (Trade Office)

 Santiago de Chile (Embassy)

 Bogotá (Embassy)

 San José (Embassy)

 Havana (Embassy)

 Santo Domingo (Embassy)
 Punta Cana (Office of the Embassy)

 Quito (Embassy)

 San Salvador (Embassy)

 Guatemala City (Embassy)

 Georgetown (High Commission)

 Port-au-Prince (Embassy)

 Tegucigalpa (Office of the Embassy)

 Kingston (High Commission)

 Mexico City (Embassy)
 Monterrey (Consulate General)
 Guadalajara (Consulate)
 Tijuana (Consulate)
 Acapulco (Consular Agency)
 Cabo San Lucas (Consular Agency)
 Cancún (Consular Agency)
 Mazatlán (Consular Agency)
 Playa del Carmen (Consular Agency)
 Puerto Vallarta (Consular Agency)

 Managua (Office of the Embassy)

 Panama City (Embassy)

 Lima (Embassy)

 Port of Spain (High Commission)

 Washington, D.C. (Embassy)
 Atlanta (Consulate General)
 Boston (Consulate General)
 Chicago (Consulate General)
 Dallas (Consulate General)
 Denver (Consulate General)
 Detroit (Consulate General)
 Los Angeles (Consulate General)
 Miami (Consulate General)
 Minneapolis (Consulate General)
 New York (Consulate General)
 San Francisco (Consulate General)
 Seattle (Consulate General)
 Houston (Trade Office)
 Palo Alto (Trade Office)
 San Diego (Trade Office)

 Montevideo (Embassy)

 Caracas (Embassy)

Asia

 Dhaka (High Commission)

 Bandar Seri Begawan (High Commission)

Phenom Penh (Office of the Embassy)

Beijing (Embassy)
Chongqing (Consulate General)
Guangzhou (Consulate General)
Hong Kong (Consulate General)
Shanghai (Consulate General)

New Delhi (High Commission)
Bengaluru (Consulate General)
Chandigarh (Consulate General)
Mumbai (Consulate General)

Jakarta (Embassy)

Tehran (Interest section)

Baghdad (Embassy)

 Tel Aviv (Embassy)

 Tokyo (Embassy)
 Nagoya (Consulate)
 Kitakyushu (Trade Office)
 Osaka (Trade Office)
 Sapporo (Trade Office)

 Amman (Embassy)

 Astana (Embassy)

 Kuwait City (Embassy)

Vientiane (Office of the Embassy)

 Beirut (Embassy)

 Kuala Lumpur (High Commission)

 Ulaanbaatar (Embassy)

Yangon (Embassy)

 Islamabad (High Commission)

 Ramallah (Representative Office)

 Manila (Embassy)

 Doha (Embassy)

 Riyadh (Embassy)

 Singapore (High Commission)

 Seoul (Embassy)

 Colombo (High Commission)

 Taipei (Trade Office)

 Bangkok (Embassy)

 Ankara (Embassy)
 Istanbul (Consulate General)

 Abu Dhabi (Embassy)
 Dubai (Consulate General)

 Hanoi (Embassy)
 Ho Chi Minh City (Consulate General)

Europe

 Vienna (Embassy)

 Brussels (Embassy)

 Zagreb (Embassy)

 Prague (Embassy)

 Copenhagen (Embassy)

 Tallinn (Embassy Office)

 Helsinki (Embassy)

 Paris (Embassy)

 Berlin (Embassy)
 Düsseldorf (Consulate)
 Munich (Consulate)

 Athens (Embassy)

 Rome (Embassy)

 Budapest (Embassy)

 Reykjavík (Embassy)

 Dublin (Embassy)

 Rome (Embassy)

 Riga (Embassy)

 Vilnius (Embassy Office)

 The Hague (Embassy)

 Oslo (Embassy)

 Warsaw (Embassy)

 Lisbon (Embassy)

 Bucharest (Embassy)

Moscow (Embassy)
Vladivostok (Consulate)

 Belgrade (Embassy)

 Bratislava (Office of the Embassy)

 Madrid (Embassy)
 Barcelona (Consulate)

 Stockholm (Embassy)

Bern (Embassy)

Kyiv (Embassy)

 London (High Commission)

Oceania

 Canberra (High Commission)
 Sydney (Consulate General)

 Wellington (High Commission)
 Auckland (Consulate)

Multilateral organisations

Addis Ababa (Permanent Observer)

Jakarta (Permanent Mission)
 
Brussels (Permanent Mission)
  Food and Agriculture Organization
Rome (Permanent Mission)
  International Civil Aviation Organization
Montreal (Permanent Mission)
International Organizations and Agencies in Vienna
Vienna (Permanent Missions)

Brussels (Canadian Joint Delegation to the North Atlantic Council)
 
Washington, D.C. (Permanent Mission)
  Organization for Security and Co-operation in Europe
Vienna (Canadian Delegation)
  Organization for Economic Co-operation and Development
Paris (Permanent Delegation)

Geneva (Permanent Mission to the United Nations and other international organizations)
New York City (Permanent Mission)

Paris (Permanent Mission)

Gallery

See also

Foreign relations of Canada
List of diplomatic missions in Canada
Visa policy of Canada

Notes

References

External links

Global Affairs Canada

 
Diplomatic missions
Canada